Erika Yolanda Funes Velázquez (born 16 October 1975) is a Mexican politician affiliated with the PRI. As of 2013 she served as Deputy of the LXII Legislature of the Mexican Congress representing the State of Mexico.

References

1975 births
Living people
Politicians from the State of Mexico
Women members of the Chamber of Deputies (Mexico)
Institutional Revolutionary Party politicians
21st-century Mexican politicians
21st-century Mexican women politicians
Universidad de las Américas Puebla alumni
Deputies of the LXII Legislature of Mexico
Members of the Chamber of Deputies (Mexico) for the State of Mexico